Iu Mien Americans are Americans, primarily Indochinese refugees, of Iu Mien descent, a subset of the Yao people. This group arrived from Laos, Vietnam, and Thailand in between the late 1970s to the early 1990s as the last wave of refugees post-Vietnam War, settling primarily along the West Coast of the United States.

Classification 
The Iu Mien are under the "Yao" classification in China. It has become apparent that the term "Yao" is no more than a longstanding name used by host Chinese. These peoples traditionally do not call themselves "Yao" and not all "Yao" are Mien.

The Republic of China made the name "Yao" official in 1954 by classification for government purposes. The classification associates minorities that may or may not have related ancestry. Although they share festivities of the same creation story, Panhu (Pien Hung), it is hard to determine what relations are beyond that fact. Through recent contacts, some spoke the same language as Mien Americans while others did not, with unintelligible conversation, clearly distinct cultures, food, dress and more. There continue to be various names under the "Yao" classification for these differences, named by the Chinese, such as: Bunu, Dongnu, Panyao, etc.

It is extremely difficult to find history behind Mien origins when the term "Yao" is used. Many sources (both Western and Chinese) describe the "Yao" history, yet the particular language and people is never defined.

Wiki

History 
Iu Mien American ancestors first migrated out of China during the early 1700s and into Vietnam, Laos and Thailand. Various sources have conflicting information about where in China the Iu Mien originated. Some Iu Mien scriptures and stories state the Mien once lived in a place called “Qianjiadong” (translates into “Thousand Family Place”). The legend of the Qianjiadong says that there was only one way in and out of its peaceful and beautiful valley, through an inconspicuous cavern. This so-called homeland is said to have surrounding waterfalls and rivers, secluded from the outside world. While many doubt its actual existence, recent Chinese scholars have pointed to either current Hebei or Hunan provinces as Qianjiadong’s possible location. 

Parents of most first-generation Iu Mien Americans arrived in Laos and Thailand during the 1700s to 1800s. Reasons for this migration varied from political pressures to socio-economic ventures. They lived in Laos and Thailand peacefully until the Vietnam War.

The “Secret War” 
As early as 1964, many families of Iu Mien Americans became involved with the United States CIA missions during the "Secret War.” In an effort to block weapon transfers along parts of the Ho Chi Minh trail, the Mien provided their intelligence, surveillance, and armed manpower. From this situation, three important Iu Mien figures emerged: Colonel Chao Mai Saechao, Colonel Chao La Saechao, and Captain Vern Chien Saechao. In 1967, Colonel Chao Mai passed and his younger brother, Chao La Saechao, was promoted to Colonel.

When the American operation pulled out of Vietnam and Laos in 1975, the Lao People's Democratic Republic was established in Laos. Thousands of families were forced to seek refuge in the neighboring country of Thailand to escape political persecution for supporting the CIA.

In the next decade, roughly 60,000 were sponsored to western countries such as the United States, France, and Canada.

Resettlement 
From 1976 to 1979, the first wave of Mien families began to arrive in the United States.

Like many refugee immigrants before them, the Iu Mien have faced numerous obstacles in resettlement. 

A majority of third generation Iu-Mien are fluent in English but cannot converse in Mien. Many Iu Mien have abandoned the Taoist religion and converted to Christianity. Gender and power relations are in flux, as authority is no longer centered around the oldest male in the family. Many changes have taken place during the last 25 years. It has been argued that "traditional" Iu Mien culture will disappear in a matter of decades and ethnic identity will slowly diminish through generations.

Population
Approximately 50,000 Iu Mien settled along the western coast of the U.S. in states of California, Oregon and Washington. Approximately 10,000 or less have settled in other parts of the country, in states of Alabama, Alaska, Texas, Tennessee, Michigan, Illinois, North Carolina and other states. This ethnicity group has yet to be included in the United States Census and consequently, current population numbers have been skewed anywhere from 40,000 to 50,000. Since resettlement in America, historical contacts have been and continue to be made, between Mien Americans and Mien in China and Vietnam. Many Mien American relatives still remain in the countries of Laos and Thailand.

As a people from ancient, isolated farming societies, first Iu Mien American generations struggled through obstacles of language, acculturation and more as they resettled in bustling, modern cities. As younger generations Americanize, they face generational gaps, loss of language, loss of culture, lack of identity and more. Community-based organizations formed among communities in Washington, Oregon and California to provide direct services, catering to resettlement issues.

They celebrated their 31st anniversary in Sacramento, California, on July 7, 2007. Achievement awards were given to Mien American military service members, doctors, educators, scholars, leaders, and others.

There are approximately 50,000 Mien in the US as of 2012, with 15,000 of those in Sacramento, and 13,000 in the East Bay.

Iu Mien people have settled all across continents of the world. There are Iu Mien who settled in the United States, Australia, Belgium, Canada, Denmark, France, Laos, Myanmar, New Zealand, Switzerland, Thailand, and Vietnam after or during the "Secret War."

There is a large population of Iu Mien Americans that have settled in the city of Sacramento, California, as well as in Oakland, Richmond, San Jose, Merced, Visalia, Stockton, Fresno, Yuba City, Oroville, Gridley, and Redding. In Oregon, most of the Iu Mien populations are resided in Salem and the greater Portland area. In Washington, most of the Iu Mien population are living in the King County of the greater Seattle area.

Culture

Marriage 
The patrilineal clan system plays a central role in identifying Iu Mien’s culture. Iu Mien has 12 clan names and operates parallel to the Hmong clan system (MacDonald, 2009). Within the practice, intermarriages among the clan are essential. However, for members with a related tradition, intermarriage is barred. The individual families have sub-clans that play a critical role in religious and socialization functions. The sub-clans are more vital than clans due to their social position and closeness with individual members.

Marriage is an essential social function among Iu Mien. Iu Mien has a distinct cultural practice concerning marriages and sexuality where elders play a critical role in presiding over marriages. The elders are respected and play a central role in blessing newborns with protective spirits. The elders shun premarital sex and childbearing out of wedlock. A groom’s family has to pay an extra dowry for any child born out of wedlock.

Music 
In traditional days, Mien communicate by singing and telling folk stories. It was a way of philosophical communication and a way of teaching by passing on stories in profound songs generations after generations. Singing and reciting by doing noble ritual offerings to the ancestors from the "Book of Death," burning incense "Tao / Dao" was a way to keep the roots educated and benevolence performing peaceful harmony in ceremonies. "The Book Of Death" is very much the same as the Tibetan "Book of the Dead" and the Three Bardo Thodol. In this Book of Life and Death are the names of ancestors from birth to death, family lineage passed down by generations. The rebirth of the new generation is believed to be in the mixture of Hip-hop, Pop and R&b and some can be found very articulate, powering and political. Nowadays, Mien people usually write their own songs or they translate Thai and Lao songs into Mien.

Traditional dishes 
Mien traditional dishes/diets consist of vegetables, chicken, pork, beef, fish, and rice. Authentic dishes are mien pork-sausages (pork with mien herbs/seasoning), ah-won (pork stew), Klang Phen (rice flour that is cooked, complemented with spicy bean paste and sour broth), steamed or boiled pork, chicken, or beef with Tofu, Ka-Soy, rice noodle and meat salads, fermented pickled mustard greens, fermented Mien bean paste (thop choi/thop zhay), roast/baked fish wrapped in banana leaf (modernly wrapped in banana leaf as well as foil) and banana-leaf wrap roast/steam ground-pork, beef, or chicken. A traditional condiment is Mien pepper sauce Fuhn-tsu.

Other influences include Tum Som, also known as papaya salad (originally a Thai/Lao dish), and Larb (a Thai/Lao dish).

See also

Iu Mien people
Yao people

References

External links
The Virtual Hilltribe Museum
Mienh.net
The Iu-Mien Community Online
IMMIEN.com
LearnMien.com
Voice For The People
The Yao ethnic minority

Asian-American society
Yao people